The listed buildings in Lancaster, Lancashire (the unparished area within the wider City of Lancaster district), are divided into:

Listed buildings in Lancaster, Lancashire (central area)
Listed buildings in Lancaster, Lancashire (outer areas)

Lists of listed buildings in Lancashire
Buildings and structures in Lancaster, Lancashire